Wally Trusler (10 April 1941 – 3 April 2008) was  a former Australian rules footballer who played with Footscray in the Victorian Football League (VFL).

Notes

External links 		
		
		
		
		
		
		
		
1941 births		
2008 deaths		
Australian rules footballers from Victoria (Australia)		
Western Bulldogs players